Gennaro Troianiello (or spells as Troianello; born 21 March 1983) is an Italian footballer who plays as a midfielder for Italian Serie D club A.S.D. S.F. Gladiator 1912.

Football career
Troianiello started his career at regional league Eccellenza. He then followed Calangianus which was promoted to Serie D. After helping them finish 7th, he was signed by Ischia of Eccellenza.

In summer 2004, he was signed by Nuorese, where he helped bring the club from Eccellenza to Serie C2 in two years. In the 2006–07 season, Nuorese finished as a losing side of promotion playoffs. In January 2007 he was signed by Frosinone, effective on 1 July.

Frosinone
On 1 July 2007 Troianiello became a player for Frosinone. On 10 July Serie A side Chievo also acquired half of the registration rights for €180,000 (paid via the transfer of Alfredo Cariello; Troianiello at first joined Chievo in definitive deal and was sold back to Frosinone in co-ownership). He made only five appearances in his first Serie B season, and was loaned to Ternana of Serie C1 in January 2008.

In the 2008–09 season, he was loaned to Foggia of Lega Pro Prima Divisione (ex-Serie C1). In June 2009, Frosinone bought Troianiello outright for €265,000, and Angelo Antonazzo was bought back by Chievo also for €265,000,

Troianiello scored 11 league goals and started 39 Serie B matches for Frosinone in the 2009–10 season.

Siena
On 24 June 2010, Frosinone bought his teammate Caetano outright from Siena, and sold Troianiello to Siena for €2 million. As part of the deal, Frosinone also signed Gianluca Sansone from Siena in a co-ownership deal for €400,000. Troianiello signed a 3-year contract.

Sassuolo
In June 2012 Sassuolo signed Troianiello for €575,000 and 50% registration rights of Sansone for €425,000. In the 2012/13 season, Troianiello scored five goals and managed six assists in 31 appearances as his side were promoted from Serie B.

Palermo
On 2 July 2013 he was signed by U.S. Città di Palermo for free. He was used only sparingly, making 16 appearances in all competitions as Palermo were promoted from Serie B.

Bologna
Troianiello was loaned out from Palermo to Bologna for the 2014–15 season. He made only 11 appearances as Bologna achieved promotion from Serie B, making it his third successive promotion from Serie B, with three different clubs.

Salernitana
Troianiello played the first half of the 2015–2016 season with Salernitana.

Ternana
In January 2016, he was loaned out to Ternana. He made 3 appearances in Serie B.

Verona
On 31 August 2016, he was signed by Verona.

Fano
After being released by Sambenedettese, he joined Fano in February.

Honours
Calangianus
Eccellenza (Group Sardegna) champions: 2002

Nuorese
Serie D champions: 2006
Eccellenza (Group Sardegna) champions: 2005

References

External links
 Profile at La Gazzetta dello Sport (2009–10) 
 Profile at La Gazzetta dello Sport (2007–08) 
 Profile at AIC.Football.it 
 

Italian footballers
Serie B players
Serie C players
Serie D players
Frosinone Calcio players
Ternana Calcio players
Calcio Foggia 1920 players
A.C.N. Siena 1904 players
U.S. Sassuolo Calcio players
Nuorese Calcio players
Palermo F.C. players
Bologna F.C. 1909 players
U.S. Salernitana 1919 players
Hellas Verona F.C. players
S.S. Ischia Isolaverde players
Alma Juventus Fano 1906 players
Association football forwards
Footballers from Naples
1983 births
Living people